YF-415 was a covered lighter in service with the United States Navy during World War II.  It was accidentally sunk on May 11, 1944 while disposing of surplus explosive ordnance near Boston Harbor.

Early career
YF-415 was built at the American Shipbuilding Company in Buffalo, New York.  She was completed and placed in service in September 1943.  She was 132 feet long and could carry cargo up to 250 tons.  She operated in and around Boston, Massachusetts.

Loss
On May 10, 1944 she sailed to the Hingham Naval Ammunition Depot in Hingham, Massachusetts, a few miles south of Boston on the south shore of Cape Cod Bay.  She was commanded by Chief Boatswain's Mate Louis B. Tremblay.  Her mission was to pick up surplus ordnance and dispose of it in deep water.  She was loaded with 150 tons of 5 and 3-inch projectiles and other ordnance.  There were thirty sailors on board - fourteen of her regular crew and sixteen African-American sailors from the naval ammunition depot to assist in the disposal of the munitions.

At 11:30 AM on May 11, the crew began to dispose of the ordnance and disposed of about two thirds of the ordnance without incident.  The next group of munitions were rockets, which safety regulations required that the matches attached to the rockets be removed first, in order to ensure they would not be accidentally ignited.  Apparently, the crew of YF-415 was not briefed on this procedure.  

At 12:30 PM there was an explosion, caused by one of the rockets detonating, which engulfed the port side of the ship in flames which began to spread throughout the vessel.  The sailors on board YF-415 quickly abandoned ship and clung to floating debris.  A total of fourteen men, one of whom later died of his injuries, were rescued by the patrol yacht USS Zircon, with sixteen being lost with YF-415. 

The investigation of the incident called for improved safety protocols, including having similar missions conducted by a towed barge and making life preservers more readily accessible.

The wreck of YF-415 was discovered by diver Bob Foster on November 3, 2002.  On May 12, 2012 there was a ceremony in honor of the sailors who died on YF-415.

References

 

Ships built in Buffalo, New York
1943 ships
Ships sunk by non-combat internal explosions
Maritime incidents in May 1944
Shipwrecks of the Massachusetts coast
Hingham, Massachusetts
Wreck diving sites